Fernand Ouellette is a Quebecois writer. He is a three-time winner of the Governor General's Awards, having won the Governor General's Award for French-language non-fiction at the 1970 Governor General's Awards for Les actes retrouvés, the Governor General's Award for French-language fiction at the 1985 Governor General's Awards for Lucie ou un midi en novembre, and the Governor General's Award for French-language poetry at the 1987 Governor General's Awards for Les Heures.

Life
He was born in Montreal, Quebec on 24 September 1930.

Works
Poetry
These angels of blood, Montreal, L'Hexagone, 1955
Sequences of the wing, Montreal, L'Hexagone, 1958
The sun in death, Montreal, L'Hexagone, 1965; The sun in death (preceded wing Sequences and radiographs), Montreal, Typo 1995
In the dark, Montreal, L'Hexagone, 1967
Poetry (1953-1971), Montreal, The Hexagon 1972
Wanderings, Montreal, Editions Bourguignon, 1975
Here, there, light, Montreal, The Hexagon 1977
In short, Montreal, Editions Parallel 1979
In the night, the sea (1972-1980), Montreal, The Hexagon 1981
Awakenings, Obsidian, Montreal, with nine lithographs by Léon Bellefleur, 1982
Nella Notte, Il Mare altre poetry, translated from Italian by Antonella Emina Martinetto, Rome, Bulzoni Editore, 1986
Clocks, Montreal / Seyssel, Hexagon / Champ Vallon, 1987; Typo 1988; Typo 2007
Wells of light, trans. English Barry Callaghan and Ray Ellenwood, Toronto, Exile Editions, 1989
Beyond the passage, Montreal, The Hexagon 1997
Selection of poems (1955-1997), presenting Georges Leroux, Montreal, coll. "the lily", Fides, 2000
The unforgettable, Chronicle I, Montreal, L'Hexagone, 2005
The unforgettable, Chronicle II, Montreal, L'Hexagone, 2006
The unforgettable, Chronicle III, Montreal, L'Hexagone, 2007
The wide presence, Montreal, L'Hexagone, 2008
The Steep, Volume I, Montreal, L'Hexagone, 2009
The Steep, Volume II, Montreal, L'Hexagone, 2009
The Absent, Éditions du passage, illustrated with 34 works on paper by Christian Gardair, Montreal, 2010
Wake of the addition (choice of poems 1953-2008), preface by Georges Leroux, Montreal, Typo, 2010
At the extreme of the time (2010-2012 poems), Montreal, L'Hexagone, 2013
Hours, translated from English by Antonio D'Alfonso, Toronto, Buffalo, Lancaster, coll. "Essential translation", Guernica Editions, 2014.
Progress towards the invisible, Montreal, L'Hexagone, 2015
Novels
You intensely watched Genevieve, Montreal, Les Quinze, 1978; Introducing Joseph Bonenfant, Montreal, Typo 1990
The bright death, Montreal, Les Quinze, 1980; Presentation by Pierre Ouellet, Typo 1992
Lucie or one afternoon in November, Montreal, Boreal, 1985
 Non-Fiction
Edgard Varèse. A Musical Biography. London: Calder and Boyars, 1973

References

External links
  Archives of Fernand Ouellette (Fonds Fernand Ouellette, R11784) are held at Library and Archives Canada

1930 births
Canadian poets in French
Governor General's Award-winning poets
Living people
20th-century Canadian poets
21st-century Canadian poets
Canadian male poets
Writers from Montreal
Governor General's Award-winning non-fiction writers
Governor General's Award-winning fiction writers
20th-century Canadian novelists
Canadian male novelists
Canadian novelists in French
20th-century Canadian male writers
21st-century Canadian male writers
Canadian male non-fiction writers
Prix Alain-Grandbois